Civil Aviation Agency Slovenia (CAA) is the civil aviation authority in Slovenia. Its head office is in Ljubljana.

References

External links
 Civil Aviation Agency Slovenia
 Civil Aviation Agency Slovenia 
Civil aviation authorities in Europe
Government of Slovenia